Roseolovirus is a genus of viruses in the order Herpesvirales, in the family Herpesviridae, in the subfamily Betaherpesvirinae. There are currently six species in this genus. Diseases associated with this genus include: HHV-6: sixth disease (roseola infantum, exanthema subitum); HHV-7: symptoms analog to the 'sixth disease'.

Species 
The genus consists of the following six species:

 Human betaherpesvirus 7
 Human betaherpesvirus 6A
 Human betaherpesvirus 6B
 Macacine betaherpesvirus 9
 Murid betaherpesvirus 3
 Suid betaherpesvirus 2

Structure 
Viruses in Roseolovirus are enveloped, with icosahedral, spherical to pleomorphic, and round geometries, and T=16 symmetry. The diameter is around 150-200 nm. Genomes are linear and non-segmented, around 200kb in length.

Life cycle 
Viral replication is nuclear, and is lysogenic. Entry into the host cell is achieved by attachment of the viral glycoproteins to host receptors, which mediates endocytosis. Replication follows the dsDNA bidirectional replication model. DNA-templated transcription, with some alternative splicing mechanism, is the method of transcription. The virus exits the host cell by nuclear egress, and  budding.
Humans serve as the natural host. Transmission routes are direct contact and respiratory.

Diseases 
Human herpesvirus 6 (HHV-6) is a set of two closely related herpes viruses known as HHV-6A and HHV-6B that infect nearly all human beings, typically before the age of two. The acquisition of HHV-6 in infancy is often symptomatic, resulting in childhood fever, diarrhea, and exanthem subitum rash (commonly known as roseola). Although rare, this initial infection can also cause febrile seizures, encephalitis or intractable seizures.

Like the other herpesviruses (Epstein–Barr virus, Human alphaherpesvirus 3, etc.), HHV-6 establishes lifelong latency and can become reactivated later in life. This reactivation has been associated with many clinical manifestations. Reactivation can occur in locations throughout the body, including the brain, lungs, heart, kidney and gastrointestinal tract. In some cases, HHV-6 reactivation in the brain tissue can cause cognitive dysfunction, permanent disability and death.

A growing number of studies also suggest that HHV-6 may play a role in a subset of patients with chronic neurological conditions such as multiple sclerosis, mesial temporal lobe epilepsy, status epilepticus and chronic fatigue syndrome.

References

External links 

  Newly Found Herpes Virus Is Called Major Cause of Illness in Young, New York Times
 HHV-6 Foundation
 
 Virus Pathogen Database and Analysis Resource (ViPR): Herpesviridae
 Viralzone: Roseolovirus
 ICTV

Pediatrics
Betaherpesvirinae
Virus genera